Chaco tecka is a species of mygalomorph spiders of Argentina, named after its type locality: Rio Tecka, Chubut, Argentina. Females can be distinguished from those of other species of Chaco by the strong and numerous spines on metatarsus IV and by the presence of pseudopreening combs on metatarsi III and IV. From C. patagonica and C. sanjuanina, females differ also in the patterned cephalothorax and legs.

Description
Its cephalic region is convex; the fovea is slightly procurved. The labium possesses no cuspules. A serrula is absent; the sternal sigilla is small and shallow; the sternum is rebordered. Its cephalothorax is yellowish brown; the legs are of the same colour, but lighter; it carries darker spots on its cephalic region, on the retrolateral apex of the femora, the middle of the patellae, and the base of the tibiae.

See also
Spider anatomy
List of Nemesiidae species

References

External links
ADW entry

Nemesiidae
Spiders of Argentina
Spiders described in 1995